The 1986 Dwars door België was the 41st edition of the Dwars door Vlaanderen cycle race and was held on 23 March 1986. The race started and finished in Waregem. The race was won by Eric Vanderaerden.

General classification

References

1986
1986 in road cycling
1986 in Belgian sport
March 1986 sports events in Europe